

Silver Sun is the debut full album by the British power pop band Silver Sun.  It was released in May 1997 on Polydor Records and was produced by Nigel Godrich.

Changing their name from Sun, under which their debut EP had been released, their debut studio album was released under the name Silver Sun.  The album received critical acclaim, but had limited chart success, reaching #30 in the UK Album Chart.  Four singles were released from the album; "Lava", "Last Day", "Golden Skin" and "Julia", of which, only "Golden Skin" and "Lava" reached the UK Top 40.  "Golden Skin" was used in the soundtrack of the British romantic comedy film Shooting Fish which was released the same year as the album.

Track listing
All tracks written by James Broad.
"Test" – 0:15
"Golden Skin" – 3:16
"Dumb" – 2:12
"Julia" – 3:19
"Far Out" – 2:57
"Last Day" – 3:37
"Service" – 3:01
"Yellow Light" – 3:33
"Lava" – 2:39
"2 Digits" – 3:09
"This 'n' That" – 2:47
"Wonderful" – 2:45
"Bad Haircut" – 2:40
"Nobody" – 3:34
"Animals Feet" – 4:03

Personnel
Nigel Godrich - production & mixing
James Broad - lead vocals, guitar
Paul Smith - guitar
Richard Buckton - bass, piano, vocals
Richard Sayce - drums
Jeff Cummins - album illustrations

References

Silver Sun albums
1997 debut albums
Albums produced by Nigel Godrich
Polydor Records albums